Torture Central: E-mails From Abu Ghraib is the title of the memoir of Michael Keller, a soldier stationed in Abu Ghraib, Iraq during 2005/2006. It was published on October 29, 2007, and chronicles many events previously unreported in the news media, including torture that continued at Abu Ghraib over a year after the abuse photos were published.

External links 
 Official Book Website 
 Tales of pain at Abu Ghraib, book review by Thomas Lake, St. Petersburg Times, 11 January 2008.

2007 non-fiction books
American autobiographies
Abu Ghraib torture and prisoner abuse
Memoirs of imprisonment
Military autobiographies
Books about the 2003 invasion of Iraq